Vulgar auteurism is a movement that emerged in early 2010s cinephilia and film criticism associated with championing or reappraising filmmakers, mostly those working in the horror and action genres and whose work has otherwise received little attention or negative reception in the critical mainstream. It became a controversial topic in the cinephile community following the publication of an article in the Village Voice in 2013 and has been described as "a critical movement committed to assessing the 'unserious' artistry of popcorn cinema with absolute seriousness."

Background
According to film critic Peter Labuza, vulgar auteurism "seems to have been an unconscious movement before it ever had a name", as the earliest criticism identified as exhibiting "vulgar auteurism" was published in the Canadian film magazine Cinema Scope in 2006 and 2007. Cinema Scope writer Andrew Tracy coined the term in his 2009 article, "Vulgar Auteurism: The Case of Michael Mann". Initially pejorative, the term was repurposed by MUBI user John Lehtonen. Over the years which followed, MUBI's online film magazine began to publish more and more articles defending genres and directors which were unpopular with the critical mainstream.

It derives its name from the auteur theory, a key component of film criticism which posits that the director is the author ("auteur") of a film and that films should be analyzed in terms of how they fit into a director's larger body of work. Also known as "auteurism," the auteur theory was introduced by French critics associated with the film magazine Cahiers du cinéma during the 1950s and popularized in the United States in the 1960s by Andrew Sarris.

In 1981, J. Hoberman coined the term "vulgar modernism" to describe the "looney" fringes of American popular culture (e.g. the animators Tex Avery and Chuck Jones, MAD Magazine, TV pioneer Ernie Kovacs and the films of Frank Tashlin).

Several critics, including Richard Brody of The New Yorker and Scott Foundas of Variety, have drawn parallels between the earliest French and American proponents of the auteur theory and vulgar auteurism. However, many commentators on the movement consider vulgar auteurism to be distinct from the classical auteur theory, pointing to its concern with visual style over theme. The question of whether vulgar auteurism is a legitimate separate movement or a subset of the auteur theory is a point of disagreement among film critics.

Vulgar auteurist ideas gained currency when one of the movement's leading proponents, critic Ignatiy Vishnevetsky, became the co-host of the television program Ebert Presents: At the Movies, produced by Roger Ebert. However, while "vulgar auteurist" criticism was becoming popular, the term and the movement to which it corresponded remained obscure until the publication of an article by Calum Marsh, "Fast & Furious & Elegant: Justin Lin and the Vulgar Auteurs", in The Village Voice on May 24, 2013.

Controversy and criticism

Marsh's article was immediately controversial. While some took issue with the films and filmmakers being championed by the proponents of vulgar auteurism, others took issue with the idea that vulgar auteurism was a movement distinct from the auteur theory.

Former Village Voice critic Nick Pinkerton has been associated with vulgar auteurism, as he has written essays in praise of directors championed by the movement and whose 2012 article "The Bigger and Better Mousetraps of Paul W. S. Anderson" has been described as vulgar auteurist. However, Pinkerton has been critical of the movement; in an article written in response to Marsh's, he decried the term "vulgar auteurism" as "a shameless attention grab", arguing that "no persuasive argument has yet been made for why the phrase should be vitally necessary to modify old, fuddy-duddy Auteurism." He further objected to the argument that film critics routinely panned the works of directors included within the movement, writing, "Fast & Furious 6, which we're assured is scorned by critics the world over, currently stands at 61% at Metacritic, above The Great Gatsby (54%), and within striking distance of arty jazz like Simon Killer and Post Tenebras Lux."

Notable directors

Paul W. S. Anderson
 Kathryn Bigelow
 Michael Bay
 Joe Carnahan
 John Carpenter
 Jon M. Chu
 Jaume Collet-Serra
 Roger Corman
 David Cronenberg
 Brian De Palma
 Clint Eastwood
 Roland Emmerich
 Peter Farrelly & Bobby Farrelly (the Farrelly brothers)
 Abel Ferrara
 David Fincher
 Renny Harlin
 Walter Hill
 Godfrey Ho
 Donald G. Jackson
 Richard Kelly
 Mark L. Lester
 Baz Luhrmann
 Justin Lin
 McG
 Michael Mann
 John McTiernan
 Rudy Ray Moore
 Russell Mulcahy
 Mark Neveldine and Brian Taylor
 Todd Phillips
 Alex Proyas
 Sam Raimi
 Matt Reeves
 George A. Romero
 Joel Schumacher
 Tony Scott
 M. Night Shyamalan
 Zack Snyder
 Steven Soderbergh
 Steven Spielberg
 Sylvester Stallone
 Quentin Tarantino
 Johnnie To
 Paul Verhoeven
 Lars von Trier
 The Wachowskis
 Doris Wishman
 Jim Wynorski
 Edward D. Wood Jr.
Rob Zombie

Notable films

 8mm (1999)
 A.I. Artificial Intelligence (2001)
 Ali (2001)
 Antichrist (2009)
 The A-Team (2010)
 AVP: Alien vs. Predator (2004)
 Basic Instinct (1992)
 The Black Dahlia (2006)
 The Blackout (1997)
 Blue Steel (1990)
 The Cat in the Hat (2003)
 Changeling (2008)
 Che (2008)
 Christine (1983)
 Cloverfield (2008)
 Crank (2006)
 The Curious Case of Benjamin Button (2008)
 Dangerous Game (1993)
 Deja Vu (2006)
 Die Hard with a Vengeance (1995)
 Domino (2005)
 The Driller Killer (1979)
 The Driver (1978)
 Escape From L.A. (1996)
 The Expendables (2010)
 The Fast and the Furious: Tokyo Drift (2006)
 Fast & Furious 6 (2013)
 Fast Five (2011)
 Flags of Our Fathers (2006)
 The Game (1997)
 Geronimo: An American Legend (1993)
 G.I. Jane (1997)
 The Girl with the Dragon Tattoo (2011)
 Go Go Tales (2007)
 Gran Torino (2008)
 The Happening (2008)
 Halloween II (2009)
 Halloween III: Season of the Witch (1982)
 How the Grinch Stole Christmas (2000)
 Indiana Jones and the Kingdom of the Crystal Skull (2008)
 In the Cut (2003)
 Lady in the Water (2006)
 Last Action Hero (1993)
 Maniac Cop (1988) 
 Man on Fire (2004)
 The Matrix Revolutions (2003)
 Me, Myself and Irene (2000)
 Miami Vice (2006)
 Midnight in the Garden of Good and Evil (1997)
 Million Dollar Baby (2004)
 Mission to Mars (2000)
 Mystic River (2003)
 Near Dark (1987)
 New Rose Hotel (1998)
 Nymhomaniac (2011)
 Ocean's 12 (2004)
 Ocean's 13 (2007)
 Pain & Gain (2013)
 Point Break (1991)
 Predator (1987)
 The Punisher (1989)
 Public Enemies (2009)
 Redacted (2007)
 Resident Evil (2002)
 Resident Evil: Retribution (2012)
 Rocky Balboa (2006)
 The Rock (1996)
 Rollerball (2002)
 Shallow Hal (2001)
 Showgirls (1995)
 Snake Eyes (1998)
 Solaris (2002)
 Southland Tales (2006)
 Spider-Man 2 (2004)
 Spider-Man 3 (2007)
 Starship Troopers (1997)
 Stuck on You (2003)
 Sudden Impact (1983)
 Taken (2009)
 The Taking of Pelham 123 (2009)
 There's Something About Mary (1998)
 Total Recall (1990)
 Transformers: Dark of the Moon (2011)
 Unbreakable (2000)
 Unstoppable (2010)
 The Village (2004)
 War of the Worlds (2005)

See also

Related movements 
 American New Wave
 Arthouse action film
 Cinéma du look
 French New Wave
 Minimalist and Maximalist film
 New French Extremity
 Postmodernist film
Modernist film
 Social thriller
 Indiewood

Related genres 
 B-movie
 Blockbuster film
 Classical Hollywood cinema
 Exploitation film
 Extreme cinema
 Giallo
 Grindhouse
 Music video
 Postmodern horror
 Video nasty

Similar debates 
 Rockism and poptimism
 Telephilia
 Video games as an art form

References

2009 neologisms
Concepts in film theory
Film and video terminology
Film criticism
Film theory
1970s in film
1980s in film
1990s in film
2000s in film
2010s in film
Horror films
Action films
Science fiction films
Postmodern art